Ivanko killed Ivan Asen I, ruler of the renascent Second Bulgarian Empire, in 1196.  The murder occurred when Asen angrily summoned Ivanko to discipline him for having an affair with his wife's sister.

In 1197 Ivanko, who was a Vlach according to the terminology used by Niketas Choniates, married Theodora Angelina, the daughter of Anna Angelina and the sebastokrator Isaac Komnenos. Theodora's father had died in Bulgarian captivity not many months earlier. 

Ivanko, who adopted the Greek name Alexios, fought at first for his grandfather-in-law, the Byzantine emperor Alexios III Angelos, but afterwards turned against him. He captured the general Manuel Kamytzes in 1198; Kamytzes was ransomed by his son-in-law, Ivanko's rival, Dobromir.

The emperor's sons-in-law Alexios Palaiologos and Theodore Laskaris marched against Ivanko in 1200, and he was eventually captured when Alexios promised not to harm him in a peace council but then took him prisoner.

Sources
  pp. 257–259, 281-285.
Robert Lee Wolff, "The `Second Bulgarian Empire'. Its Origin and History to 1204". Speculum, Vol. 24, No. 2 (Apr., 1949), pp. 167–206. Published by: Medieval Academy of America

12th-century births
13th-century deaths
12th-century murderers
12th-century Bulgarian people
13th-century Bulgarian people
Regicides
Bulgarian people of the Byzantine–Bulgarian Wars
Medieval Bulgarian military personnel
Medieval assassins